Lorenzo Callegari (born 27 February 1998) is a French professional footballer who plays as a midfielder for Canadian Premier League club HFX Wanderers.

Club career

Paris Saint-Germain

Callegari signed his first, three-year, professional contract with Paris Saint-Germain on 1 July 2015. He made his professional debut on 30 November 2016 in the Ligue 1 match against Angers. He replaced Lucas after 87 minutes in a 2–0 home win.

Genoa
On 10 July 2018, Serie A club Genoa confirmed the signing of Callegari on a free transfer. He signed a four-year contract with the Italian side. He was loaned out to Serie C club Ternana on 24 August 2018.

Avranches
On 2 August 2019, Callegari signed for French club Avranches on a two-year contract.

Chambly
In June 2020, Callegari joined Ligue 2 club Chambly.

HFX Wanderers
In January 2023, Callegari joined Canadian Premier League club HFX Wanderers on a one-year contract, with an option for 2024.

Personal life
He is Italian through his father who is from Bettola.

Career statistics

Honours
Paris Saint-Germain U19
 Championnat National U19: 2015–16
 UEFA Youth League runner-up: 2015–16

France U17
UEFA European Under-17 Championship: 2015

References

External links

 
 
 PSG profile
 

1998 births
Living people
People from Meudon
French footballers
France youth international footballers
French sportspeople of Italian descent
People of Emilian descent
Paris Saint-Germain F.C. players
Genoa C.F.C. players
Ternana Calcio players
US Avranches players
FC Chambly Oise players
HFX Wanderers FC players
Ligue 1 players
Ligue 2 players
Championnat National players
Serie C players

Association football midfielders
Footballers from Hauts-de-Seine
French expatriate footballers
Expatriate footballers in Italy
Expatriate soccer players in Canada
French expatriate sportspeople in Italy
French expatriate sportspeople in Canada